Lippia abyssinica, or koseret, is a species of flowering plant in the verbena family, Verbenaceae.  It is endemic to Ethiopia but cultivated throughout tropical African countries.  The specific epithet abyssinica derives from Latin and means 'of or from Ethiopia (Abyssinia)'.

The plant grows as a 3m tall shrubby herb at 1600-2000m altitude in Ethiopia.  It has hairy leaves and small flowers that are purple or pink.

Other common names include kosearut, lemon herb, butter clarifying herb, Gambey tea bush, and Gambia(n) tea bush, although the latter can also apply to Lippia multiflora. Besides the word koseret, in Amharic it is also called kesse or kessie. In Gurage it can be called koseret, kesenet, or quereret. German speakers call it  (Gambia tea shrub). In Sierra Leone it is named a-kimbo and in the Congo it is called ngadi or dutmutzuri.

Uses
 Koseret, specifically the subspecies L. a. var. koseret, is dried and used as an herb in Ethiopian cuisine.  The smell is camphorous and minty.  Some describe its flavor as being similar to basil, but it is not closely related to that herb (they are merely in the same order, Lamiales).  Koseret is closely related to the herb Mexican oregano (not to be confused with oregano), sharing the same genus Lippia. It is commonly used in making the spiced oils niter kibbeh and ye'qimem zeyet and the spice mix afrinj.  Koseret along with the other herbs and spices preserve the butter and oil, preventing spoilage for up to 15 years. In these preparations koseret then flavors many common dishes, such as kitfo.  In Democratic Republic of the Congo and Republic of the Congo it is eaten as a potherb.  In west Africa, notably The Gambia, it is brewed into a tisane as a substitute for tea.

 The plant has also been used as traditional medicine for cough, fever, constipation, and cutaneous conditions such as burns.  It also is used as an insecticide and antimicrobial treatment and shows some promising antibacterial properties.  Koseret has some antioxidant activity as well.

References

External links

Endemic flora of Ethiopia
Medicinal plants
Herbs
Ethiopian cuisine
abyssinica
Plants described in 1969
Tesmi